is a 1988 Japanese horror film directed by Nobuhiko Obayashi.

Cast
 Morio Kazama as Hidemi Harada
 Tsurutarô Kataoka as Hidekichi Harada (Father)
 Kumiko Akiyoshi as Fusako Harada (Mother)
 Yûko Natori as Kei Fujino
 Toshiyuki Nagashima as Ichiro Mamiya

Awards
31st Blue Ribbon Awards
 Won: Best Supporting Actor - Tsurutarō Kataoka
 Won: Best Supporting Actress - Kumiko Akiyoshi
13th Hochi Film Award
 Won: Best Supporting Actor - Tsurutarō Kataoka
16th Moscow International Film Festival
 Nominated: Golden St. George
10th Yokohama Film Festival 
 Won: Best Supporting Actor - Tsurutarō Kataoka
4th Best Film

References

Further reading

External links
 

1988 films
1988 horror films
Films based on Japanese novels
Films directed by Nobuhiko Obayashi
1980s Japanese-language films

Japanese horror films
1980s Japanese films

ja:異人たちとの夏